Erynnis propertius, commonly known as Propertius duskywing, is a species of butterfly in the family Hesperiidae. It is found in along the west coast of North America from southern British Columbia south along the Pacific Slope to Baja California Norte. It is one of the most commonly seen skippers in California.

The wingspan is 35-45 mm. Its wings are mottled brown, the fore wings with white spotting. While other duskywings like the funereal duskywing and the mournful duskywing have white fringe on their hind wings, the Propertius duskywing has brown fringe.

The larvae have a light green body and brown head. They feed on Quercus species. Adults feed on a wide variety of flower nectar.

References

External links
Butterflies and Moths of North America

Erynnis
Butterflies described in 1870
Butterflies of North America
Taxa named by Samuel Hubbard Scudder